The Principality of Antioch mirrored the Latin Kingdom of Jerusalem in its selection of great offices: constable, marshal, seneschal, admiral, Chamberlain, butler, chancellor and at certain times also bailiff.  

The Officers of the Principality of Antioch are as follows:

Constable
Robert (1098)
Richard (1101–1114), perhaps only titularly
Adam (1101–1114)
Rainald I Masoir (1126–1134)
Walter de Sourdeval (1134–1140)
Roger des Monts (1140–1149)
Archibald (1153)
Geoffrey Sourdain (1154)
Guiscard de l'Île (1170–1172)
Baldwin (1174–1175)
Rainald II Masoir (1179–1181)
Ralph des Monts (1186–1194)
Roger des Monts (1195–1201)
Robert Mansel (1207–1219)
William de Hazart (1219)
Simon Mansel (1262)

Marshal
Raymond (1140)
Guarin Malmuz (1140–1160)
William Tirel (1149–1169)
William de Cava (1175–1186)
Bartholomew Tirel (1186–1191)
Hugh Flauncurt (1193–1200)
Thomas (1200–1231)
Basil (1210), either honorarily or as marshal of Armenia
Bartholomew Tirel (1262)

Seneschal
Eschivard de Sarmenia (1149–1169)
Gervais de Sarmenia (1181–1199)
Acharie de Sarmenia (1216–1251)
Peter de Hazart (1262)

Chamberlain
Trigaud (1138)
Basil (1140)
Peter (1151–1172)
William (1163)
Raymond de Gibelet (1174)
Oliver (1179–1190)
Simon Burgevin (1195)
Simon (1215–1216)

Butler
Martin de Margat (1140–1144)
Peter Salvarici (1149)
William de Moci (1169)
Paganus (1210)
Julien le Jaune (1216)

Chancellor
Walter (1114–1122)
Ralph (1127)
Franco (1133–1135)
Eudes (1140–1143)
John (1149)
Walt (1154)
Geoffrey (1154–1155)
Bouchard (1155)
Bernard (1163–1170)
William (1172)
John (1177–1183), became bishop of Tripoli
Albert (1186–1200), archbishop of Tarsus, perhaps only titular chancellor
John of Corbonio (1203–1205), perhaps also constable as well as chancellor of the County of Tripoli
Jourdain (1215–1216)
John (before 1225), perhaps same as John of Corbonio
Geoffrey (1241)
William (1262)

Bailiff
Raymond (assassinated at Tartus, 1213), son of Bohemond IV of Antioch and his first wife Plaisance of Gibelet

See also
Officers of the Kingdom of Jerusalem
Officers of the Kingdom of Cyprus
Officers of the County of Tripoli
Officers of the County of Edessa

References

La Monte, John L. Feudal Monarchy in the Latin Kingdom of Jerusalem 1100 to 1291. Medieval Academy of America, 1932. Cf. pp. 252–60.

Principality of Antioch